iTunes Originals – Ben Lee (2006) is an iTunes Originals release by Australian musician Ben Lee. It is exclusive to the Australian and New Zealand iTunes Stores.

Track listing
iTunes Originals
Nirvana Inspired Me to Start a Band
I Wish I Was Him (iTunes Originals Version)
Recording in Chicago and Singing with Liz Phair
Away with the Pixies
I Was Trying to Make Sense of the World
How to Survive a Broken Heart
Learning the Rules of Pop Songs
Cigarettes Will Kill You
One of the Strangest Nights on Tour
Nothing Much Happens (iTunes Originals Version)
My Last Dribs and Drabs of Teenage Angst
Something Borrowed Something Blue
Danger and Rock and Roll
Running with Scissors
The Bens
Bruised (iTunes Originals Version)
Now is the Time to be Awake
Gamble Everything for Love (iTunes Originals Version)
Songs About Surrender
Whatever It Is (iTunes Originals Version)
Dreaming About Drugs and Bright Eyes
The Debt Collectors (iTunes Originals Version)
It Just Felt Good
Catch My Disease (iTunes Originals Version)

Footnotes

Ben Lee albums
ITunes Originals
2006 live albums
2006 compilation albums